The Louvre is an art museum in Paris, France, located in the Louvre Palace.

Louvre or Louvres may also refer to:
 Louvre (window), a window blind or window shutter
 Louvre window, a window composed of louvres
 Louvres, Val-d'Oise, a commune in Île-de-France, France
 4513 Louvre, an asteroid
 "The Louvre" (song), a 2017 song by Lorde from Melodrama
 L'Œuvre (novel) an 1885 novel by Émile Zola
 Le Louvre: The Palace & Its Paintings, a 1995 art-based video game
 The Messenger (2001 video game) or Louvre: L'Ultime Malédiction

People with the surname
 Jean de Louvres, French architect

See also

 Carrousel du Louvre, a shopping centre under the palace grounds
 École du Louvre, an institution of higher education in the palace
 Groupe du Louvre, a French hotel group
 Hôtel Louvre et Paix, Marseilles, France
 Louvre Abu Dhabi, a branch of the museum in Abu Dhabi, United Arab Emirates
 Louvre Accord, signed by the G6 in 1987 in the palace
 Medieval Louvre, the predecessor to the present-day building
 Louvre-Lens, a branch of the museum in the Lens, Pas-de-Calais, France
 Louvre – Rivoli (Paris Métro), a station on Paris Métro
 Palais Royal – Musée du Louvre (Paris Métro), a station on the Paris Metro
 Place du Louvre, a square next to the palace
 Port du Louvre, a riverside walkway next to the palace
 Quai du Louvre, a river quai on the Seine next to the palace